Michaels is the largest arts and crafts retail chain in the United States. It is part of The Michaels Companies.

Michaels may also refer to:

 Michaels (surname)
 Michaels, California, the former name of Coarsegold, California
 Michaels Park (Edmonton), Canada
 , a New York jazz venue
 Associated with contract bridge game:
 Leaping Michaels
 Michaels cuebid

See also
 
 Michael (disambiguation)
 Saint Michael (disambiguation)